Stefan Solyom (born 26 April 1979, Stockholm) is a Swedish conductor and composer.  He is the nephew of the Swedish-Hungarian pianist János Solyom.

As a student Solyom attended the Adolf Fredrik's Music School in Stockholm. He studied horn and conducting at the Royal College of Music, Stockholm and the Sibelius Academy.  His conducting teachers included Jorma Panula and Leif Segerstam.  He was a first prize winner in the 1998 Helsingborg Symphony Orchestra conducting competition.  Solyom became Artistic Director of the Nordic Youth Orchestra in Lund in 1999.  He was a prizewinner in the 2000 International Sibelius Conducting Competition.

Solyom first conducted the BBC Scottish Symphony Orchestra (BBC SSO) in February 2005, substituting on short notice for another conductor.  He subsequently became Associate Guest Conductor of the BBC SSO in May 2006, a position specifically created for him.  He stood down from this post in December 2009.

In September 2009, Solyom became Generalmusikdirektor (GMD) of the Deutsches Nationaltheater and Staatskapelle Weimar.  His initial contract was for 5 years.  He concluded his Weimar tenure in July 2016. With the 2009-2010 season, he also became principal guest conductor of the Norrköping Symphony Orchestra, and held the post until 2013.  In March 2013, Solyom was named the next chief conductor of the Helsingborg Symphony Orchestra, as of the 2014-2015 season.

Solyom's commercial recordings include a live recording of Poul Ruders' Fairytale, for Bridge Records.  His compositions include a Concert Piece for Drums and Strings.

Solyom is married to violinist Catherine Manoukian. They live in Sweden and Germany.

References

External links
 Maestro Arts agency page on Stefan Solyom
 International Classical Artists agency biography of Stefan Solyom
 Tobias Fischer, 'Interview with Stefan Solyom'.  Tokafi.com blog, 2012
 Norsk Percussion page on Solyom Concert Piece for Drums and Strings

1979 births
Living people
Swedish conductors (music)
Male conductors (music)
Hungarian conductors (music)
Hungarian male musicians
Swedish people of Hungarian descent
21st-century conductors (music)
21st-century Swedish male musicians